Caren or Carens may refer to:

People
 Caren (name), including a list of people with the name
 Caren/Karen, a supporting character from Mermaid Melody Pichi Pichi Pitch

Places
 Caren Range, mountain range in British Columbia
 Caren, a district in Curacaví, Chile
 Estero Carén, a river in Chile

Other uses
 CAREN (system), a virtual reality system used for rehabilitation
 Kia Carens, a compact multi-purpose vehicle
 Barbus carens, a ray-finned fish
 Caren (horse), 2016 Canadian Horse of the Year

See also
 Carin
 Caryn
 Caron (disambiguation)
 Karen (disambiguation)
 Karin (disambiguation)